Aluk Island or Aluk Avalleq is an island off Prins Christian Sound, in Kujalleq municipality in southern Greenland. It is located to the east of Aluk Tunorleq island.

This island is the type locality for allanite a member of the epidote mineral group.

See also
List of islands of Greenland

References

Islands of Greenland
Kujalleq